The Emperor's Mosque (Bosnian: Careva džamija, Turkish: Hünkâr Camii) is an important landmark in Sarajevo, Bosnia and Herzegovina, being the first mosque to be built (1457) after the Ottoman conquest of Bosnia. It is the largest single-subdome mosque in Bosnia and Herzegovina, built in the classical Ottoman style of the era.

It was built by one Isaković-Hranušić who dedicated it to the Sultan, Mehmed the Conqueror, the conqueror of Constantinople. Considered one of the most beautiful mosques of the Ottoman period in the Balkans, the mosque features a roomy interior and high quality decorative details, such as the mihrab.

History
The original mosque was built in the mid-15th century. Damaged and totally destroyed at the end of that century, it was rebuilt in 1565 and dedicated this time to Suleiman the Magnificent.

The first mosque was made of wood and significantly smaller than existing building that was built in 1565. Side rooms were added in 1800 and connected to the central prayer area in 1848. Between 1980 and 1983 the painted decorations in the interior of the mosque were conserved and restored. The burial ground (graveyard) beside the Emperor's Mosque contains the graves of viziers, mullahs, muftis, sheikhs, the employees in the Emperor's Mosque, along with other prominent figures living in Sarajevo.

The mosque was damaged during World War II but mostly in the wars during the 1990s, and renovation work is pending.

The first settlements in Sarajevo were built around the mosque with the residence of the Sultan's representatives then being built next to the mosque. Isa-bey also built a hammam (public bath) and a bridge that led directly to the mosque. This bridge was disassembled during the Austro-Hungarian government and rebuilt just a few meters upstream where it still exists today.

On the other side of the river, he built a caravanserai. For the financing of these facilities, Isa-bey left a heritage of many shops, land and properties.

See also
 Timeline of Islamic history
 Islamic architecture
 Islamic art
 List of mosques in Europe
 Islam in Bosnia and Herzegovina

References

External links

Official website

Religious buildings and structures completed in 1457
15th-century mosques
Mosques in Sarajevo
Stari Grad, Sarajevo
Ottoman mosques in Bosnia and Herzegovina
National Monuments of Bosnia and Herzegovina
Medieval Bosnia and Herzegovina architecture